The Commissioner of Corrective Services is a statutory office-holder in the State of New South Wales, Australia, with responsibility for the State's prison, parole and community corrections systems. The incumbent is Kevin Corcoran PSM. Prior to 2009, the Commissioner managed his own Department of Corrective Services. Since 2009, Corrections has been a division of the State's justice department, currently known as the Department of Communities and Justice.

Previous office-holders 

Between 1979 and 1988, the Department of Corrective Services was managed by a five-person Corrective Services Commission. This model had been recommended by John Nagle in his royal commission report. From 2009, the Commissioner served as a deputy secretary within the larger Department of Justice. Although commissioners have generally been recruited from other professions, both the incumbent and his predecessor began their careers as prison officers.

List of Corrective Services Commissioners

References 

Australian public servants
Government of New South Wales
Prisons in New South Wales